Kelvin Kirk (December 31, 1953 – July 2, 2003) was an American football wide receiver and kick returner who played for seven seasons in the Canadian Football League. Kirk was also the first Mr. Irrelevant (a humorous award given to the last player picked in the NFL Draft), as the 487th and last draft pick in the 1976 NFL Draft (On the note of the 1976 NFL draft, this was the draft that had the most players ever drafted and he was the last one selected making him the most irrelevant Draft pick of all time).

Early years
Born in Mount Pleasant, Florida, Kirk's family relocated to Dayton, Ohio and he starred at Dunbar High School. Kirk then stayed in town to play his college ball at the University of Dayton, where he led the nation with 24.5 yards per reception in 1975.

"Mr. Irrelevant"
Kirk was drafted by the defending Super Bowl champion Pittsburgh Steelers in the seventeenth and final round of the 1976 NFL Draft, making him the first Mr. Irrelevant of the NFL Draft, an "honor" afforded the last player picked in the draft. (Kirk was the very last of 487 selections, the most ever in an NFL draft.)

Career
After being cut by the Steelers, Kirk headed north to play in the Canadian Football League; he wound up spending seven seasons (1977–83) in the CFL, playing with the Toronto Argonauts, Calgary Stampeders, Saskatchewan Roughriders and Ottawa Rough Riders. He compiled over 6,500 yards in Canada as a wide receiver (153 catches for 2,942 yards and 16 touchdowns), punt returner (1,678 yards and 2 TD) and kickoff returner (1,922 yards and a touchdown).

Following his career in the CFL, Kirk worked as an artist for the Ottawa Citizen before his sudden death by heart attack while playing a pick-up game of basketball in 2003. Kirk was 49.

References

External links
Just Sports Stats
College stats

1953 births
2003 deaths
Players of American football from Florida
Players of Canadian football from Florida
Players of American football from Dayton, Ohio
Players of Canadian football from Dayton, Ohio
American football wide receivers
Canadian football wide receivers
African-American players of American football
African-American players of Canadian football
Dayton Flyers football players
Toronto Argonauts players
Calgary Stampeders players
Saskatchewan Roughriders players
Ottawa Rough Riders players
Ottawa Citizen people
People from Gadsden County, Florida
20th-century African-American sportspeople
21st-century African-American people